Hakui may refer to:

Hakui, Ishikawa, Japan
Hakui District, Ishikawa, Japan
Hakui, Nepal